Tesco PLC is an international retailer with headquarters in the United Kingdom.

Tesco may also refer to:
Fresh & Easy, the US subsidiary of the company (sold November 2013)
Tesco Ireland Limited, the Irish subsidiary of that company
Tesco Lotus Thai supermarket
Tesco.com, the online service offered by Tesco
Tesco Corporation, a defunct provider of services for the oil industry
Tesco Organisation, a German record label
Tesco Town, British slang for an area where there is a dominant supermarket arguably stifling other competitors in that area
Tesco Value (band), Danish music band
Tesco Vee, musician and co-founder of Touch and Go Records
Nicky Tesco, member of British punk rock band The Members